Minudie is a community in the Canadian province of Nova Scotia, located in Cumberland County about  from River Hebert.

Once a thriving town with a population peaking about 1870 at more than 600 people, Minudie today still has three churches but a population of just 20. Industries included shipbuilding, farming, lumbering and the manufacture of grindstones. It was settled, dyked, and farmed by Acadians in the eighteenth century. After the expulsion, the lands were granted to J.F.W. DesBarres, who leased it to displaced Acadians and others who farmed the marshlands, and cut grindstones along the shore. Amos Seaman (1788-1864), the self-appointed "Grindstone King", assumed control of the grindstone quarries there about 1826 and was also largely responsible for the rest of the industries there as well.

References

Further reading
History of Minudie

External links

Communities in Cumberland County, Nova Scotia
General Service Areas in Nova Scotia
Ghost towns in Nova Scotia